The 2020–21 Slovak Cup was the 52nd edition of the competition. The tournament began on 25 July 2020 and the final was played on 19 May 2021.

Slovan Bratislava were the defending champions, defeating Ružomberok in the 2020 final.

Slovan won a second consecutive title, defeating Žilina in the final.

The winner of the Slovak Cup earned automatic qualification for the second qualifying round in UEFA Europa Conference League. As Slovan had already qualified for the 2021–22 UEFA Champions League as league champion, the spot was decided by the Europa Conference League play-offs, which was eventually won by Žilina.

Format 
The Cup was played as a knockout tournament contested by 229 teams - one more than the previous edition. Teams (excluding 'B' teams) from the top five levels played along with two winners of regional cups. All ties are decided on the day with penalty shoot-outs used to decide drawn matches. All rounds are played as one-off matches except the semi-finals which are played over two legs.

Prize money 
In this season, the fixed amount of prize money paid to the clubs is as follows:

 Winning the final: €50,000
 Losing finalist: €20,000
 Semi-finals: €5,000

The most successful club from the regional football associations will receive a financial reward of €3,000 if they end before semifinal. Teams that participate in the 1st and 2nd round will receive match balls (for home club five and for away club three).

First round 
101 matches in the first round were played from July 25, 2020, to August 5, 2020. The first round is regional, which means that, only teams from one region meet each other. Matches of the first round drew the divisional football associations. If the score is still level after ninety minutes, a team advancing to next round will be reached by penalty shoutout.

|}

Second round 
64 matches in the second round were played from August 12, 2020, to September 16, 2020.

|}

Third round 
32 matches of the 3rd round were played from September 16. 31 matches finished until October 7. Only one match including DAC Dunajská Streda was rescheduled on a spring 2021 due COVID-19 pandemic and participation in Europa League.

|}

Fourth round 
Due COVID-19 pandemic all matches of the 4th and 5th rounds have been rescheduled on a spring 2021. In Slovakia from 11 October no sports event were allowed, expect top leagues of some sports.
On March 10, the organizers Slovak Football Association decided that the competition would be played only with clubs from the first and second leagues. Clubs from the lower leagues have been banned from official matches and trainings since October 2020. There were still 19 clubs from the first and second leagues left in the competition, and there were to be 16 clubs in the 5th round. 6 teams, selected by worst places from 2019–20 Slovak Cup, played an additional play-off in the 4th round. It was Dubnica, Šamorín, Podbrezová, Zemplín Michalovce, Komárno and FC Košice.

|-
!colspan="3" align="center"|23 March

|-
!colspan="3" align="center"|24 March

|}
1 Played on neutral pitch in Poprad.
 2 3Played on neutral pitch in Topoľčany.

Round of 16  
The draw was on March 25. Matches were played on April 6–7.

|-
!colspan="3" align="center"|6 April

|-
!colspan="3" align="center"|7 April

|}
 1 6 8Played on neutral pitch on NTC Senec.
 2 4Played on neutral pitch in Zvolen.
 3 5 7Played on neutral pitch in Topoľčany.

Quarter-finals 
The draw was on April 8. Matches will be played on April 13–14.

Semi-finals 
The draw was on April 15. Semi-finals was played on April 28 and May 5.

First leg

Second leg

Final 

The final match was played on May 19 on Tehelné Pole in Bratislava.

See also 
 2020–21 Slovak First Football League

References

External links 
  

Slovak Cup seasons
Cup
Slovak Cup